Marion E. "Guts" Meadows was a college football player for coach Mike Donahue's Auburn Tigers football team. He played in the line and was selected All-Southern in 1912.

References

Auburn Tigers football players
American football tackles
American football guards
All-Southern college football players